is a Japanese professional footballer who plays as a midfielder for J3 League club Azul Claro Numazu. He played for the Japan national team.

Club career
Ito was born in Shizuoka on 31 August 1974. After graduating from high school, he joined J1 League club Shimizu S-Pulse based in his local in 1993. He debuted in June 1994 and played several matches in 1994 season. He became a regular midfielder under manager Masakatsu Miyamoto from 1995 season and played as central player for the club for a long time. In 1996, S-Pulse won the champions in J.League Cup first title in the club history. In 1999, S-Pulse the 2nd place in J1 League and he also was selected Best Eleven award. In 2000, S-Pulse won the Asian title, 1999–2000 Asian Cup Winners' Cup. In 2001, S-Pulse won Emperor's Cup. After that, the club results was sluggish. In 2005, former teammate Kenta Hasegawa became a new manager. Although S-Pulse finished at the 15th place which is worst position in the club history in J1 League, S-Pulse won the 2nd place in 2005 Emperor's Cup. However the club results was raised under manager Hasegawa from 2006 and S-Pulse won the 2nd place in 2008 J.League Cup. Ito also played all matches in J1 League from 2006 to 2008 season and received the fair play awards in 2007. In 2010, his opportunity to play decreased and he resigned end of 2010 season.

In 2011, Ito moved to newly promoted J1 club Ventforet Kofu with Daisuke Ichikawa who is teammate in S-Pulse for 13 seasons. On 16 July 2011, he became a first player to earn 500th matches in J1 League. Although, Ventforet was relegated to J2 League from 2012, the club won the champions in J2 and returned to J1 in a year. However Ito played only 6 matches in 2013 season and left the club end of 2013 season. In 2014, he moved to newly promoted J3 League club AC Nagano Parceiro. However he could not play many matches and left the club end of 2015 season. In 2016, he moved to J3 club Blaublitz Akita where he spent the 2016 season. In 2017, he moved to newly promoted J3 club Azul Claro Numazu. He finally made his début for Azul Claro Numazu two years later, on 24 November 2019, as an 81st-minute substitute for Kotaro Tokunaga in a 3–1 home win over Gainare Tottori.

International career
In July 1996, Ito was selected for the Japan U23 national team for the 1996 Summer Olympics. At this tournament, he played the whole 90 minutes in all three matches. He is most remembered for his goal against Brazil in Atlanta which earned Japan a shock 1–0 victory. It was known as the "Miracle of Miami" (マイアミの奇跡) in Japan.

Ito was capped 27 times for the Japan national team between 1997 and 2001. He was an unused substitute at the 1998 FIFA World Cup.

Career statistics

Club

International

Honors
Japan
 FIFA Confederations Cup runner-up: 2001

Individual
 J1 League Best Eleven: 1999
 J.League Fair Play Award: 2007

References

External links
Profile at Azul Claro Numazu

Japan National Football Team Database

1974 births
Living people
Association football people from Shizuoka Prefecture
Japanese footballers
Japan international footballers
J1 League players
J2 League players
J3 League players
Shimizu S-Pulse players
Ventforet Kofu players
AC Nagano Parceiro players
Blaublitz Akita players
Azul Claro Numazu players
Olympic footballers of Japan
Footballers at the 1996 Summer Olympics
1998 FIFA World Cup players
1999 Copa América players
2001 FIFA Confederations Cup players
Association football midfielders